The Curtiss R-600 Challenger was a six-cylinder, double-row, air-cooled, radial engine for aircraft use built in the United States in the late 1920s. It developed .

Design and development
Curtiss started work on a small six-cylinder engine in May 1927. The engine was unusual in its design with aluminium cylinders mounted at 60°, so that it was in effect two staggered three cylinder engines.

Applications
 ANBO VI
 Curtiss Robin
 Curtiss-Wright CW-14C Travel Air
 Hodkinson HT-1
 Rearwin 2000

Specifications (R-600)

See also

References

Citations

Bibliography
 
 USAF museum

External links

1920s aircraft piston engines
Aircraft air-cooled radial piston engines
R-600